Glenbawn Dam is a major ungated earth and rock fill with clay core embankment dam with concrete chute spillway plus fuse plugs across the Hunter River upstream of Aberdeen in the Hunter region of New South Wales, Australia. The dam's purpose includes flood mitigation, hydro-electric power, irrigation, water supply and conservation. The impounded reservoir is called Lake Glenbawn.

The Act appropriated A£ as the estimated cost of construction of the dam.

Location and features
Commenced in late 1947 and completed in late 1957, the Glenbawn Dam is a major dam on the Hunter River and is the fourth largest earth-filled embankment dam in Australia by volume. The dam was built by the New South Wales Water Conservation & Irrigation Commission to supply water for irrigation and flood mitigation.

The ungated concrete chute spillway is capable of discharging . Glenbawn Dam is operated in conjunction with Glennies Creek Dam. The two dams supply water requirements along  of the Hunter River from Glenbawn to the tidal reaches near Maitland.

The name Glenbawn originates after a riverside property resumed for part of the storage area.

Power generation
The station was completed in January 1995. The facility is managed by AGL Energy.

Recreation
The dam is a popular location for water skiing and fishing, both by boat and from shore. Located adjacent to the dam and the lake is a nature reserve; Lake Glenbawn State Park.

See also

 AGL Energy
 Irrigation in Australia
 List of dams and reservoirs in New South Wales

References

External links
 
 

Dams completed in 1958
Energy infrastructure completed in 1995
Dams in New South Wales
Upper Hunter Shire
Earth-filled dams
Embankment dams
Hydroelectric power stations in New South Wales
Hunter River (New South Wales)